Death in Soho is the latest album released by the English punk band 999, released in September 2007.

Track listing 
All tracks by Nick Cash & Guy Days except where noted.

 "Gimme the World" – 2:22 
 "The System" – 3:02
 "Innocent" – 4:08
 "Last Breathe" (Cash, Days, Pablo Labritain) – 3:18
 "99 Days" – 2:31
 "Rock N Roll World" – 2:30
 "Get Off the Phone" – 3:04
 "Horror Story" – 2:11
 "Stealing Beauty" – 2:12 
 "What Do You Know" – 2:18
 "Deep Peace" – 2:37
 "Too Much Money" – 2:39
 "Life of Crime" – 2:22 
 "The Avenue" – 3:10
 "Bomb You" – 2:07

Personnel 
999
Arturo Bassick – bass, vocals
Nick Cash – guitar, vocals
Guy Days – guitar, vocals
Pablo Labritain – drums, vocals
Technical
Pat Collier - engineer

References  
5 songs also available on the US compilation

The Sharpest Cuts 93-2007 (Gutterwail)

999 (band) albums
2007 compilation albums